The Xarames were a Native American people of the San Antonio, Texas region.  They were the dominant Native American group during the early history of Mission San Antonio de Valero (commonly known as "The Alamo").

Sources
Barr, Juliana. Peace Came in the Form of a Woman: Indians and Spaniards in the Texas Borderlands. Chapel Hill: University of North Carolina Press, 2007. p. 128.

Native American tribes in Texas